Ralph E. Edwards was an American politician from Maine. A Republican from Oxford, Maine, Edwards spent 4 terms (1942-1950) in the Maine Legislature. His first 4 years were spent in the Maine House of Representatives and his last 4 in the Maine Senate.

In 1961, the Legislature named a bridge over the Oxford Stream in Edwards' hometown of Oxford 'Ralph E. Edwards Bridge'.

References

Year of birth missing
Year of death missing
People from Oxford, Maine
Republican Party members of the Maine House of Representatives
Republican Party Maine state senators